Osmany Juantorena Portuondo (born 12 August 1985) is a Cuban-born Italian volleyball player, a member of Cuba national volleyball team in 2003–2006 and current member of Italy national volleyball team and Turkish club Ziraat Bankasi. Juantorena was bronze medalist of the 2005 World League and silver medalist 2016 Summer Olympics. He is a multiple winner of the CEV Champions League and FIVB Club World Championship with the Italian club Trentino Volley. Juantorena is the record owner of the highest number of Most Valuable Player awards at FIVB Club World Championship, with 4 times.

Personal life
Juantorena was born in Santiago de Cuba. He is a nephew of Alberto Juantorena, a Cuban former track runner and politician. Osmany Juantorena and his wife Glenda became first time parents on May 3, 2013 with the arrival of their first baby daughter named Victoria. On September 23, 2018 with arrival second baby daughter named Angelica.

He is fan of Inter and in 2019 he launched a shoe line.

Career

Clubs
He started his junior career as 12 years old in the Orientales de Santiago. After several years, he moved to his first professional club in the Russian league – Ural Ufa, and in the following season he went to the Itas Diatec Trentino. During his time playing in Italy, he won the gold medal at the CEV Champions League three times with his club (2009/2010, 2010/2011) and the bronze medal in 2012. He won four gold medals in the FIVB Volleyball Men's Club World Championship (2009, 2010, 2011, 2012). With the club from Trentino, he won two silver (2009/2010, 2011/2012) and one gold medal of the Italian Championship (2010/2011) and two Italian Cups (2010, 2012). In May 2010 he played for a short loan in Qatar. He returned to Itas Diatec Trentino in September 2010. In 2012/2013 won Italian Cup and title of Italian Champion.

After moving to Halkbank Ankara in 2013, he achieved the Turkish SuperCup 2013 and the title of Turkish champion. In 2014 Halkbank Ankara, including Juantorena, gained again Turkish SuperCup. In April 2015 he announced that he would continue his career in Cucine Lube Civitanova.

National Team
Juantorena first stormed the international stage back in 2003 up to 2006 with Cuba. With Cuba he won bronze medals at 2005 FIVB World League. Juantorena joined Italy national team 2015 year, but it is with Italy where he is reaping the most success, claiming a European championship bronze and FIVB World Cup silver medalist in 2015. Juantorena has had a hugely positive impact on Italy’s attacking prowess in 2016 Summer Olympics. Juantorena finally played in an Olympic game as a member of the powerful Italian team and won silver medal.

Sporting achievements

Clubs

CEV Champions League
  2009/2010 – with Itas Diatec Trentino
  2010/2011 – with Itas Diatec Trentino
  2011/2012 – with Itas Diatec Trentino
  2013/2014 – with Halkbank Ankara
  2015/2016 – with Cucine Lube Civitanova
  2016/2017 – with Cucine Lube Civitanova
  2017/2018 – with Cucine Lube Civitanova
   2018/2019 – with Cucine Lube Civitanova

FIVB Club World Championship
  Qatar 2009 – with Itas Diatec Trentino
  Qatar 2010 – with Itas Diatec Trentino
  Qatar 2011 – with Itas Diatec Trentino
  Qatar 2012 – with Itas Diatec Trentino
  Poland 2017 – with Cucine Lube Civitanova
  Poland 2018 – with Cucine Lube Civitanova
  Brazil 2019 – with Cucine Lube Civitanova
  Brazil 2021 – with Cucine Lube Civitanova

National championship
 2009/2010  Italian Cup Serie A, with Itas Diatec Trentino
 2009/2010  Italian Championship, with Itas Diatec Trentino
 2010/2011  Italian Championship, with Itas Diatec Trentino
 2011/2012  Italian Cup Serie A, with Itas Diatec Trentino
 2011/2012  Italian Championship, with Itas Diatec Trentino
 2012/2013  Italian Cup Serie A, with Itas DiatescTrentino
 2012/2013  Italian Championship, with Itas Diatec Trentino
 2013/2014  Turkish SuperCup2013, with Halkbank Ankara
 2013/2014  Turkish Championship, with Halkbank Ankara
 2014/2015  Turkish SuperCup2014, with Halkbank Ankara
 2014/2015  Turkish Cup, with Halkbank Ankara
 2014/2015  Turkish Championship, with Halkbank Ankara
 2016/2017  Italian Cup, with Cucine Lube Civitanova
 2016/2017  Italian Championship, with Cucine Lube Civitanova
 2017/2018  Italian Cup, with Cucine Lube Civitanova
 2017/2018  Italian Championship, with Cucine Lube Civitanova
 2018/2019  Italian Cup, with Cucine Lube Civitanova
 2018/2019  Italian Championship, with Cucine Lube Civitanova
 2019/2020  Italian Cup, with Cucine Lube Civitanova
 2020/2021  Italian Cup, with Cucine Lube Civitanova
 2020/2021  Italian Championship, with Cucine Lube Civitanova
 2021/2022  Italian Championship, with Cucine Lube Civitanova

National team
 2003  Pan American Games
 2005  FIVB World League
 2015  FIVB World Cup
 2015  CEV European Championship
 2016  Olympic Games

Individual
 2005 Russian League – Most Valuable Player
 2005 FIVB World League – Best Receiver
 2009 FIVB Club World Championship – Best Server
 2010 CEV Champions League – Most Valuable Player
 2010 FIVB Club World Championship – Best Spiker
 2010 FIVB Club World Championship – Most Valuable Player
 2011 CEV Champions League – Most Valuable Player
 2011 FIVB Club World Championship – Best Spiker
 2011 FIVB Club World Championship – Most Valuable Player
 2011 Seri A – Best Server
 2012 Italian Cup – Most Valuable Player
 2012 Emir of Qatar Cup - Most Valuable Player
 2012 FIVB Club World Championship – Most Valuable Player
 2014 Italian Cup – Most Valuable Player
 2014 Turkey League – Most Valuable Player
 2015 Emir of Qatar Cup - Most Valuable Player
 2015 FIVB World Cup – Best Outside Spiker
 2017 FIVB Club World Championship – Most Valuable Player
 2018 CEV Champions League – Best Outside Spiker
 2019 CEV Champions League  – Most Valuable Player
 2019 FIVB Club World Championship – Best Outside Spiker
 2020 Italian Cup – Most Valuable Player

References

External links

LegaVolley Serie A player profile

1985 births
Living people
Cuban men's volleyball players
Italian men's volleyball players
Cuban sportsmen
Cuban people of Basque descent
Sportspeople from Santiago de Cuba
Cuban emigrants to Italy
Cuban expatriates in Italy
Expatriate volleyball players in Italy
Cuban expatriates in Russia
Expatriate volleyball players in Russia
Cuban expatriates in Qatar
Expatriate volleyball players in Qatar
Cuban expatriate sportspeople in Turkey
Expatriate volleyball players in Turkey
Ural Ufa volleyball players
Halkbank volleyball players
Volleyball players at the 2003 Pan American Games
Pan American Games silver medalists for Cuba
Olympic volleyball players of Italy
Volleyball players at the 2016 Summer Olympics
Medalists at the 2016 Summer Olympics
Olympic silver medalists for Italy
Olympic medalists in volleyball
Trentino Volley players
Pan American Games medalists in volleyball
Medalists at the 2003 Pan American Games
Volleyball players at the 2020 Summer Olympics
Outside hitters